The 1970 World Field Archery Championships were held in Cardiff, Wales.

Medal summary (Men's individual)

Medal summary (Women's individual)

Medal summary (team events)
No team event held at this championships.

References

World Field Archery Championships
World Field Archery Championships
World Field Archery Championships 
International archery competitions hosted by the United Kingdom
International sports competitions hosted by Wales
World Field Archery Championships